Starnet may refer to:
 Star network, a datacomm networking topology
 STAR (interbank network), a banking communication network
 StarNet, a Moldovan ISP
 STARNET, the NATO Science, Technology and Research Network
 starNet, a wireless network in Hobart, Tasmania, part of TasWireless
 STARNet, the United Airlines nickname for Star Alliance airline alliance network

See also
 NetStar Communications
 Starlink (disambiguation)